Samuel King Vaughan (April 20, 1824September 28, 1872) was an American businessman and Wisconsin pioneer.  He served as a Union Army officer throughout the American Civil War and was granted an honorary brevet to brigadier general.  After the war, he served a term as sheriff of Columbia County, Wisconsin.

Career
Vaughan joined the Union Army as a second lieutenant in the 2nd Wisconsin Volunteer Infantry Regiment on June 11, 1861. He resigned his commission on September 16, 1861. He rejoined the army on March 31, 1862, as a captain in the 19th Wisconsin Volunteer Infantry Regiment. He was promoted to major on January 22, 1864. He later took part in the Siege of Petersburg. When Richmond, Virginia was occupied by the Union Army on April 3, 1865, the 19th Wisconsin Infantry was the first regiment to reach the city and Vaughan received the distinction of raising the regiment's flag at the city hall. He assumed command of the regiment later that month. He was promoted to lieutenant colonel on May 3, 1865. Vaughn was mustered out of the volunteers on August 9, 1865. He received an appointment as brevet colonel to rank from August 9, 1865, preliminary to his appointment as a brevet brigadier general of volunteers. On February 21, 1866, President Andrew Johnson nominated Vaughn for appointment to the grade of brevet brigadier general of volunteers to rank from August 9, 1865, and the United States Senate confirmed the appointment on April 10, 1866.

Vaughan died at his home in Portage, Wisconsin, on September 28, 1872, after a months-long illness.

References

1824 births
1872 deaths
People from Adams, Massachusetts
People from Portage, Wisconsin
People of Wisconsin in the American Civil War
Union Army officers
Wisconsin sheriffs